"I Got the Hoss" is a song written by Gerald House, and recorded by American country music artist Mel Tillis.  It was released in August 1977 as the first single from the album Love's Troubled Waters.  The song reached #3 on the Billboard Hot Country Singles & Tracks chart.

Chart performance

References

1977 singles
1977 songs
Mel Tillis songs
Song recordings produced by Jimmy Bowen
MCA Records singles
Songs about horses